Žarko Soldo (14 April 1953 – 12 March 2011) was a Serbian football manager and player.

Playing career
Soldo spent his entire career at his hometown club Proleter Zrenjanin. He made over 250 league appearances for the side between the early 1970s and mid-1980s, mainly in the Yugoslav Second League.

Managerial career
After hanging up his boots, Soldo was manager of numerous clubs in his homeland, including two spells at Serbian SuperLiga sides Hajduk Kula and Banat Zrenjanin.

Death
On 12 March 2011, while serving as manager of Timok, Soldo died during a friendly match due to heart attack at the age of 57.

References

External links
 

Association football midfielders
FK Banat Zrenjanin managers
FK Hajduk Kula managers
FK Proleter Zrenjanin players
FK Timok managers
Serbia and Montenegro football managers
Serbian football managers
Serbian SuperLiga managers
Sportspeople from Zrenjanin
Yugoslav First League players
Yugoslav Second League players
Yugoslav footballers
1953 births
2011 deaths